Phaeo (minor planet designation: 322 Phaeo) is an asteroid from the central regions of the asteroid belt, approximately  in diameter. It was discovered on 27 November 1891, by French astronomer Alphonse Borrelly at the Marseille Observatory in southern France. The presumably metallic X-type asteroid is the principal body of the Phaeo family and has a rotation period of 17.6 hours. It was named for the Greek mythological figure Phaeo, one of the Hyades or nymphs. Several other asteroids were named for other of the Hyades – 106 Dione, 158 Koronis, 217 Eudora, and 308 Polyxo.

References

External links 
 Asteroid Lightcurve Database (LCDB), query form (info )
 Dictionary of Minor Planet Names, Google books
 Discovery Circumstances: Numbered Minor Planets (1)-(5000) – Minor Planet Center
 
 

000322
Discoveries by Alphonse Borrelly
Named minor planets
000322
000322
18911127